This list of military ships sunk by the Imperial Japanese Navy lists all vessels sunk by ships commissioned in the Imperial Japanese Navy, and by Japanese naval aircraft, listed alphabetically by ship name.

Australia

 HMAS Armidale: Australian corvette sunk 1 December 1942 by Japanese aircraft.
 HMAS Canberra: Australian heavy cruiser heavily damaged 9 August 1942 by IJN naval gun fire during Battle of Savo Island, and scuttled later in the day.
 AHS Centaur: Australian hospital ship torpedoed on 14 May 1943 by Japanese submarine I-177 off the coast of Queensland.
 SS Fingal: Norwegian merchant ship on charter to the Australian Government on 5 May 1943 torpedoed by the Japanese submarine I-180
 HMAS Kuttabul: Australian depot ship sunk 31 May 1942 by a Japanese midget submarine during the attack on Sydney Harbour
 HMAS Mavie:  Australian patrol boat sunk 19 February 1942 by aircraft in Darwin Harbour.
 Neptuna:  Australian merchant ship sunk 19 February 1942 by aircraft in Darwin Harbour.
 HMAS Patricia Cam: Australian general purpose vessel sunk 22 January 1943 by an IJN floatplane near the Wessel Islands.
 HMAS Perth: Australian light cruiser sunk 1 March 1942 during Battle of Sunda Strait.
 HMAS Vampire:  Australian destroyer sunk 9 April 1942 by carrier aircraft during the Indian Ocean raid.
 HMAS Voyager Australian destroyer sunk 25 September 1942 by land-based naval aircraft.
 HMAS Yarra: Australian sloop sunk 4 March 1942 by Japanese cruisers Atago, Takao, Maya, and destroyers Arashi and Nowaki.

Britain

Warships
 HMS Cicala: British gunboat sunk 21 December 1941 during an air raid on Hong Kong Harbor.
 : British heavy cruiser sunk 5 April 1942 by carrier based aircraft during the Indian Ocean raid.
 : British heavy cruiser sunk 5 April 1942 by carrier based aircraft during the Indian Ocean raid.
 HMS Dragonfly: British gunboat sunk in the Banka Strait, 14 February 1942.
 HMS Electra: British destroyer sunk 27 February 1942 by naval gun fire during the Battle of the Java Sea.
 HMS Encounter: British destroyer sunk 1 March 1942 by naval gunfire.
 : British heavy cruiser sunk 1 March 1942 by naval gunfire and a torpedo from Japanese destroyer Ikazuchi during the Battle of Java Sea.
 HMS Grasshopper: British gunboat sunk in the Banka Strait, 14 February 1942.
 HMS Hermes: British aircraft carrier sunk 9 April 1942 by carrier-based aircraft during the Indian Ocean raid.
 HMS Hollyhock: British corvette sunk 9 April 1942 by carrier-based aircraft during the Indian Ocean raid.
 HMS Pathfinder: British Destroyer sunk 11 February 1945 by aircraft off Ramree Island, Burma.
 HMS Peterel: British gunboat sunk by naval gunfire at Shanghai 8 December 1941.
 HMS Porpoise: British Submarine sunk 1945 by aircraft possibly assisted by naval escorts.
 HMS Prince of Wales: British battleship sunk 10 December 1941 by land based aircraft near Malaya.
 HMS Repulse: British battlecruiser sunk 10 December 1941 by land based aircraft near Malaya.
 HMS Scorpion: British gunboat sunk 13 February 1942 by naval gunfire from light cruiser Yura and destroyers Fubuki and Asagiri.
 HMS Stonehenge: British submarine, overdue and assumed mined 1944.
 HMS Stratagem: British submarine sunk 22 November 1944 by sub-chaser CH-35.
 : British destroyer, sunk 1942.
 HMS Tenedos: British destroyer sunk 5 April 1942 during the Indian Ocean raid.
 HMS Thanet: British destroyer sunk on 27 January 1942 by light cruiser Sendai and five destroyers.
 HMS Thracian: British destroyer badly damaged by bombing 16 December 1941 and scuttled. Later raised by the Japanese and put into service as PB-101.

Auxiliaries
 HMS Li Wo: British gunboat sunk 13 February 1942 by naval gunfire from light cruiser Yura and destroyers Fubuki and Asagiri.
 HMS St. Breock: British rescue tug bombed and sunk by Japanese aircraft off Sumatra on 14 February 1942.

Netherlands
 HNLMS De Ruyter: Dutch light cruiser sunk 27 February 1942 by torpedo from heavy cruiser  during Battle of the Java Sea.
 HNLMS Java: Dutch light cruiser sunk 27 February 1942 by torpedo from heavy cruiser  during Battle of Java Sea.
 HNLMS K VII Dutch submarine sunk 18 February 1942 by land-based naval bombers while in Surabaya harbor.
 HNLMS K XVI Dutch submarine sunk 25 December 1941 by submarine I-66 (later I-166).
 HNLMS K XVIII Dutch submarine damaged 24 January 1942 by depth charges from destroyers, which later force her scuttling.
 HNLMS Kortenaer Dutch destroyer sunk by torpedo fired by heavy cruiser Haguro during Battle of the Java Sea.
 HNLMS O 20 Dutch submarine sunk 19 December 1941 by destroyers Uranami, Ayanami and Yugiri.
 HNLMS Piet Hein Dutch destroyer sunk by torpedoes and gunfire from destroyers Arashio and Ushio during the battle of Badoeng Strait.
 HNLMS Prins van Oranje Dutch minelayer sunk 11 January 1942 by destroyer Yamakaze and patrol boat P38.
 HNLMS Van Nes Dutch destroyer sunk 17 February 1942 by carrier based planes from light carrier Ryujo.

New Zealand
  HMNZS Moa (T233): New Zealand minesweeper sunk on 7 April 1943 by aircraft at Tulagi Harbour in the Solomon Islands

United States

Aircraft Carriers
 USS Hornet:  American aircraft carrier torpedoed and sunk by Japanese destroyers on 27 October 1942, following damage from carrier-based aircraft during the Battle of the Santa Cruz Islands.
 USS Lexington:  American aircraft carrier sunk on 8 May 1942 by carrier aircraft during the Battle of the Coral Sea.
 USS Wasp:  American aircraft carrier sunk on 15 September 1942 by  while escorting transports to Guadalcanal.
 USS Princeton: American aircraft carrier sunk on 24 October 1944 by carrier based aircraft during the Battle of Leyte Gulf.

Escort Carriers
 USS Bismarck Sea: American escort carrier sunk on 21 February 1945 by kamikaze aircraft during the invasion of Iwo Jima.
 USS Gambier Bay: American escort carrier sunk on 25 October 1944 by naval gunfire in the Battle off Samar in Leyte Gulf.
 USS Ommaney Bay: American escort carrier sunk on 4 January 1945 by kamikaze aircraft.
 USS St. Lo: American escort carrier sunk on 25 October 1944 by kamikaze aircraft while in the Battle off Samar in Leyte Gulf. She was the first major warship to be sunk by kamikaze attacks.

Battleships
 USS Arizona:  American battleship sunk 7 December 1941 by carrier-based aircraft during the attack on Pearl Harbor.
 USS California:  American battleship sunk 7 December 1941 by carrier-based aircraft during the attack on Pearl Harbor.  Later raised, modernized, and sent back into combat.
 USS West Virginia:  American battleship sunk 7 December 1941 by carrier-based aircraft during the attack on Pearl Harbor.  Later raised, modernized, and sent back into combat.
 USS Oklahoma:  American battleship sunk 7 December 1941 by carrier-based aircraft during the attack on Pearl Harbor.  Later raised and sank while under tow to the scrappers.

Cruisers
 : American heavy cruiser sunk on 9 August 1942 by Japanese torpedoes and naval gunfire at the Battle of Savo Island.
 USS Atlanta: American light cruiser sunk on 13 November 1942 by a Japanese torpedo and naval gunfire at the Naval Battle of Guadalcanal.
 USS Chicago: American heavy cruiser sunk on 30 January 1943 by Japanese aircraft torpedoes during the Battle of Rennell Island.
 USS Helena: American light cruiser sunk on 6 July 1943 by Japanese naval torpedoes during the Battle of Kula Gulf.
 USS Houston: American heavy cruiser sunk 1 March 1942 by torpedoes and naval gunfire during the Battle of Sunda Strait.
 USS Juneau: American light cruiser sunk on 13 November 1942 by  after being damaged by a torpedo and naval gunfire at the Naval Battle of Guadalcanal.
 USS Northampton: American heavy cruiser sunk on 30 November 1942 by Japanese naval torpedoes during the Battle of Tassafaronga.
 USS Quincy: American heavy cruiser sunk on 9 August 1942 by Japanese torpedoes and naval gunfire at the Battle of Savo Island.
 USS Vincennes: American heavy cruiser sunk on 9 August 1942 by Japanese naval gunfire at the Battle of Savo Island.

Destroyers
 USS Aaron Ward
 USS Abner Read
 USS Barton
 USS Benham
 USS Brownson
 USS Blue
 USS Bush
 USS Callaghan
 USS Cassin: Sunk in dry dock alongside USS Downes on 7 December 1941 at Pearl Harbor. Later salvaged and rebuilt.
 USS Chevalier
 USS Colhoun
 USS Cooper
 USS Cushing
 USS De Haven
 USS Drexler: Sank after two hits by kamikaze aircraft on 28 May 1945
 USS Downes: Sunk in dry dock alongside USS Cassin on 7 December 1941 at Pearl Harbor. Later salvaged and rebuilt.
 USS Duncan: American destroyer sunk on 12 October 1942 by Japanese naval gunfire at the Battle of Cape Esperance.
 USS Edsall Sunk by Japanese battleships and heavy cruisers in early 1942 in Indonesian waters
 USS Gwin
 USS Halligan
 : Sunk on 6 June 1942 by  during the Battle of Midway.
 USS Henley
 USS Hoel
 USS Jarvis Sunk in aerial attacks during the Guadalcanal campaign in 1942.
 USS Johnston
 USS Laffey
 USS Little
 USS Luce
 USS Mahan: Sank after three kamikaze hits off Leyte on 7 December 1944.
 USS Mannert L. Abele
 USS Meredith
 USS Monssen
 USS Morrison: Sank after four hits by kamikaze aircraft on 4 May 1945 while on picket duty off Okinawa.
 USS Peary: American destroyer sunk on 19 February 1942 by aircraft in Darwin Harbour.
 USS Pillsbury Sunk in battle on 2 March 1942
 USS Pope sunk in battle, 1 March 1942
 USS Porter Sunk by air attack during the Battle of the Santa Cruz Islands 1942.
 USS Preston
 
 USS Shaw Destroyed in drydock, due to a magazine explosion; later salvaged and repaired. 
 : Sunk on 7 May 1942 by carrier aircraft during Battle of Coral Sea.
 USS Stewart A Clemson-class destroyer, heavily damaged and captured at Soerabaya. Commissioned in the Imperial Japanese Navy as Patrol boat no 102.
 USS Strong
 USS Twiggs
 USS Reid: Sank after two kamikaze hits off Leyte on 11 December 1944.
 USS Walke
 USS William D. Porter

Destroyer Escorts
 USS Eversole
 USS Oberrender
 USS Samuel B. Roberts
 USS Shelton
 USS Underhill By a Kaiten manned torpedo attack.

Submarines
 USS Albacore Sunk 7 November 1944 by Japanese mines.
 USS Amberjack Sunk 16 February 1943 by torpedo boat Hiyodori and sub-chaser CH-18 and a 958th Kōkūtai E13A1 Jake.
 USS Argonaut Sunk 10 January 1943 by destroyers Maikaze and Isokaze.
 USS Barbel Sunk 4 February 1945 by land-based naval aircraft.
 USS Bonefish Sunk 19 June 1945 by kaibokan Okinawa, CD-63, CD-75, CD-158 and CD-207.
 USS Capelin Possibly sunk November 1943 by minelayer Wakataka and 934th Kōkūtai aircraft or a Japanese mine.
 USS Cisco Sunk 28 September 1943 by gunboat Karatsu – the former USS Luzon, and a 954th Kōkūtai B5N2 Kate.
 USS Escolar Sunk 17 October 1944 by a Japanese mine.
 USS Flier Sunk 13 August 1944 by Japanese mines.
 USS Grampus Sunk 5 March 1943 by destroyers Minegumo and Murasame or by 958th Kōkūtai naval aircraft.
 USS Grayback Sunk 27 February 1944 by land-based B5N2 Kates from Okinawa.
 USS Grayling Sunk 9 September 1943 by ramming from transport Hokuan Maru.
 USS Grenadier Sunk 22 April 1943 by 936th Kōkūtai seaplanes.
 USS Growler Sunk 8 November 1944 by destroyer Shigure, and kaibokan Chiburi and CD-19.
 USS Golet Sunk 14 June 1944 by gunboat Miya Maru and auxiliary sub-chaser Bunzan Maru.
 USS Gudgeon Sunk 18 April 1944 by 901st Kōkūtai naval aircraft.
 USS Harder Sunk 24 August 1944 by kaibokan CD-22.
 USS Kete Sunk 20 March 1945 by Japanese mines.
 USS Lagarto Sunk 3 May 1945 by minelayer Hatsutaka.
 USS Perch Sunk 3 March 1942 by destroyer Ushio.
 USS Pickerel Sunk 3 April 1943 by minelayer Shirakami and auxiliary sub-chaser Bunzan Maru.
 USS Pompano Sunk August or September 1943 by either surface and air attack or Japanese mines.
 USS Runner Sunk June 1943 by either a Japanese mine or combined surface and air attack.
 USS S-44 Sunk 7 October 1943 by escort Ishigaki.
 USS Sealion: Damaged by bombing on 10 December 1941 at Cavite, Luzon, later scuttled.
 USS Scamp Sunk 11 November 1944 by kaibokan CD-4 with naval aircraft.
 USS Sculpin Sunk 19 November 1943 by destroyer Yamagumo.
 USS Scorpion Possibly sunk January 1944 by Japanese mine.
 USS Shark Sunk 11 February 1942 by destroyer Yamakaze.
 USS Shark Sunk 24 October 1944 by destroyers Harukaze and Take.
 USS Snook Sunk 9 April 1945 by kaibokan Okinawa, CD-8, CD-32, and CD-52 with a 951st Kōkūtai E13A1 Jake and Q1W1 Lorna.
 USS Swordfish Possibly sunk 4 January 1945 by Kaibokan CD-4 or a mine.
 USS Trigger Sunk 28 March 1945 by kaibokan Mikura, CD-33 and CD-59.
 USS Triton Sunk 15 March 1943 by destroyer Satsuki or sub-chaser CH-24.
 USS Trout Sunk 8 February 1944 by destroyer Asashimo.
 USS Wahoo Sunk 11 October 1943 by sub-chasers CH-15, CH-43 and 3 E13A1 Jakes.

Amphibious Warfare Ships

 USS LCI(G)-82 4 April 45 Shinyo (suicide motorboat) off Okinawa, Ryukyu Islands
 USS LCI(G)-365 10 January 45 Shinyo (suicide motorboat) in Lingayen Gulf, Luzon, Philippine Islands
 USS LCI(M)-974 10 January 45 Shinyo (suicide motorboat) in Lingayen Gulf, Luzon, Philippine Islands
 USS LCS(L)-7 16 January 45 Shinyo (suicide motorboat) off Mariveles, Corregidor Channel, Luzon, Philippine Islands
 USS LCS(L)-15 22 April 45 Kamikaze aircraft off Okinawa, Ryukyu Islands
 USS LCS(L)-26 14 February 45 Kamikaze aircraft off Okinawa, Ryukyu
 USS LCS(L)-33 12 April 45 Kamikaze aircraft off Okinawa, Ryukyu Islands
 USS LCS(L)(3)-49 16 February 45 Shinyo (suicide motorboat) off Mariveles, Corregidor Channel, Luzon, Philippine Islands
 USS LSM-12 4 April 45 foundered after being damaged by a Shinyo (suicide motorboat) off Okinawa, Ryukyu Islands
 USS LSM-20 5 December 44 Kamikaze aircraft off Ormoc, Leyte, Philippine Islands
 USS LSM-59 21 June 45 Kamikaze aircraft off Okinawa, Ryukyu Islands
 USS LSM-135 25 May 45 Kamikaze aircraft off Okinawa, Ryukyu Islands
 USS LSM(R)-190 4 May 45 Kamikaze aircraft off Okinawa, Ryukyu Islands
 USS LSM(R)-194 4 May 45 Kamikaze aircraft off Okinawa, Ryukyu Islands
 USS LSM(R)-195 3 May 45 Kamikaze aircraft off Okinawa, Ryukyu Islands
 USS LSM-318 7 December 44 Kamikaze aircraft off Ormoc, Leyte, Philippine Islands
 USS LST-460 21 December 44 Kamikaze aircraft off Mindoro, Philippine Islands
 USS LST-447 7 April 45 Kamikaze aircraft off Okinawa, Ryukyu Islands
 USS LST-472 15 December 44 Kamikaze aircraft off Mindoro, Philippine Islands
 USS LST-738 15 December 44 Kamikaze aircraft off Mindoro, Philippine Islands
 USS LST-749 21 December 44 Kamikaze aircraft off Mindoro, Philippine Islands

Mine Warfare Craft
 USS Bittern: Sunk by bombing at Cavite, Luzon on 10 December 1941.
 USS Emmons
 USS Finch
 USS Gamble
 USS Hovey
 USS Long
 USS Montgomery
 USS Oglala: Sunk 7 December 1941 at Pearl Harbor after damage from a near miss. Later raised and converted to engine repair ship.
 USS Palmer
 USS Penguin: Scuttled after strafing damage at Guam on 8 December 1941.
 USS Perry
 USS Quail
 USS Skylark
 USS Swallow
 USS Salute
 USS Tanager

Oilers
 USS Kanawha sunk on 8 April 1943 by Japanese aircraft off Tulagi, Solomon Islands.
 USS Mississinewa sunk 20 November 1944, first to be hit by a Japanese Kaiten manned torpedo.
 USS Neches sunk 28 January 1942 by torpedo from 
 USS Neosho sunk on 7 May 1942 by carrier aircraft during Battle of Coral Sea.
 USS Pecos sunk on 1 March 1942 by Japanese air attack from aircraft carrier Soryu

Transports
 USS Aludra
 USS Deimos
 USS George F. Elliott
 USS Gregory: Sunk in action off Guadalcanal in 1942.
 USS Little: Sunk in action off Guadalcanal in 1942.

Motor Torpedo Boats
 USS PT-34
 USS PT-35
 USS PT-37
 USS PT-41
 USS PT-43
 USS PT-44
 USS PT-109 Rammed by IJN destroyer Amagiri in Guadalcanal waters. Future US president John F. Kennedy survived the sinking.
 USS PT-111
 USS PT-112
 USS PT-117
 USS PT-133
 USS PT-164
 USS PT-247
 USS PT-251
 USS PT-300
 USS PT-320
 USS PT-323
 USS PT-363
 USS PT-493

Other
 : Gunboat sunk in action 3 March 1942
 : ammunition ship sunk on 28 December 1944 by kamikaze.
  (ex CV-1): Seaplane tender sunk on 27 February 1942 by land-based aircraft after departing Tjilatjap in the Dutch East Indies
 : Army transport sunk on 11 January 1942 by  near Lombok Strait.
 : Gunboat scuttled 5 May 1942 raised by Japanese-sunk while in Japanese service
 : Army transport sunk on 19 February 1942 by aircraft in Darwin Harbour.
  Gunboat scuttled to avoid capture 2 May 1942
 : Gunboat sunk in action 5 May 1942
 : Gunboat sunk in action 12 December 1937
  (ex BB-31): Former battleship, sunk 7 December 1941 by carrier-based aircraft during the attack on Pearl Harbor.
 : Gunboat captured 8 December 1941

References

Sunk by Japanese
Imperial Japanese Navy
Japanese
Japanese
Ships sunks